Shammi, Shammy or Shamy may refer to:

People

Given name
Shammi (actress) (1929–2018), Indian film actress
Shammi Akhtar (1957–2018), Bangladeshi playback singer
Shammi Iqbal (born 1975), English cricketer
Shammi Kapoor (1931–2011), Indian film actor and director
Shammi Narang (born 1956), Indian voice-over artist, news anchor, emcee, and entrepreneur
Shammi Silva (born 1960), Sri Lankan cricket administrator 
Shammi Thilakan, Indian film actor
Shammi Rana, (born 1978) Indian sports executives and administrators

Surname
Ahmed Ismail El Shamy (born 1975), Egyptian boxer
Aya El Shamy (born 1995), Egyptian volleyball player
Mohamed El Shamy (born 1993), Egyptian footballer
Hasan M. El-Shamy (born 1938), Egyptian-American folklore professor

See also
Chamois leather
Shami (disambiguation)
 Shamim (disambiguation)
Shamokin Shammies, early 20th century  New York-Pennsylvania baseball team